Jasienica  is a village in the administrative district of Gmina Myślenice, within Myślenice County, Lesser Poland Voivodeship, in southern Poland.

The village has a population of 1,500.

External links
 Jewish Community in Jasienica on Virtual Shtetl

References

Jasienica